Fredric March (born Ernest Frederick McIntyre Bickel; August 31, 1897 – April 14, 1975) was an American actor, regarded as one of Hollywood's most celebrated stars of the 1930s and 1940s. As a performer he was known for his protean versatility. Although his career never reached the same heights as that of the previous two decades, his success as an actor continued well into the 1950s and 1960s.

He began his career in 1920, by working as an extra in movies filmed in New York City. He made his stage debut on Broadway in 1926 at the age of 29, and by the end of the decade, he signed a film contract with Paramount Pictures.

Not long after his motion picture debut in 1929, he began receiving leading and major supporting roles. The year after, he gained the first major recognition of his acting career by starring in the film The Royal Family of Broadway (1930) directed by George Cukor. The role garnered him his first Academy Award nomination. The next year he would go onto win both the Academy Award for Best Actor and the Volpi Cup for Best Actor for his performance in Dr. Jekyll and Mr. Hyde (1931). These early successes quickly led to him becoming an established leading man and roles in well known classic films throughout the 1930s and 1940s, roles of which further raised his profile. These films include Design for Living (1933) with Gary Cooper; Death Takes a Holiday (1934); The Barretts of Wimpole Street (1934) with Norma Shearer; Les Misérables with Charles Laughton; Anna Karenina (1935) with Greta Garbo; The Dark Angel with Merle Oberon; Nothing Sacred (1937) with Carole Lombard and I Married a Witch (1942) with Veronica Lake. 

During this period, in 1937, he starred in the leading male role in the original A Star is Born alongside Janet Gaynor, and for which he received his third Academy Award nomination. In 1946, he would receive his fourth Academy Award nomination and win his second Academy Award for Best Actor for his performance in The Best Years of Our Lives, the film that's often regarded as the biggest success of his career. The film was directed by William Wyler and his co-stars included the likes Myrna Loy, Dana Andrews, Teresa Wright and Virginia Mayo.

During the beginning of the 1950s, March continued to enjoy major success, the first of which being for his portrayal of Willy Loman in the 1951 film adaptation of Arthur Miller's play Death of a Salesman, a role of which Miller originally wanted March to originate on stage. This performance garnered him his fifth and final Academy Award nomination and won him his second Volpi Cup for Best Actor. Other major films of his from this decade are Executive Suite (1954) with Barbara Stanwyck and William Holden; The Bridges at Toko-Ri (1954) with Grace Kelly and again with Holden; and The Desperate Hours (1955) with Humphrey Bogart.

March's film career began to decline around the mid-1950s and by the 1960s, he had started to star in a much smaller number of films than he had previously during the most successful decades of his career. In spite of this, he still had major roles in a handful of successful films during this period, they are Inherit the Wind (1960) for which he won the Silver Bear for Best Actor; Seven Days in May (1964) with Burt Lancaster, Ava Gardner and Kirk Douglas; and Hombre (1967) with Paul Newman. He closed out his career playing opposite Jeff Bridges and Lee Marvin in the 1973 film The Iceman Cometh.

He was also a well regarded stage actor. During his career acting on stage he had twice won the Tony Award for Best Actor in a Play for his performances in the plays Years Ago (1947) and Long Day's Journey into Night (1956).

March is one of only two actors, the other being Helen Hayes, to have won both the Academy Award and the Tony Award twice.

Early life
March was born in Racine, Wisconsin, the son of Cora Brown Marcher (1863–1936), a schoolteacher from England, and John F. Bickel (1859–1941), a devout Presbyterian Church elder who worked in the wholesale hardware business. March attended the Winslow Elementary School (established in 1855), Racine High School, and the University of Wisconsin–Madison, where he was a member of Alpha Delta Phi.

March served in the United States Army during World War I as an artillery lieutenant.

He began a career as a banker, but an emergency appendectomy caused him to re-evaluate his life, and in 1920, he began working as an "extra" in movies made in New York City, using a shortened form of his mother's maiden name. He appeared on Broadway in 1926, and by the end of the decade, he signed a film contract with Paramount Pictures.

Career

Like Laurence Olivier, March had a rare protean quality to his acting that allowed him to assume almost any persona convincingly, from Robert Browning to William Jennings Bryan to Dr Jekyll - or Mr. Hyde. He received an Oscar nomination for the 4th Academy Awards in 1930 for The Royal Family of Broadway, in which he played a role modeled on John Barrymore. He won the Academy Award for Best Actor for the 5th Academy Awards in 1932 for Dr. Jekyll and Mr. Hyde (tied with Wallace Beery for The Champ, although March accrued one more vote than Beery). This led to roles in a series of classic films based on stage hits and classic novels like Design for Living (1933) with Gary Cooper and Miriam Hopkins; Death Takes a Holiday (1934); Les Misérables (1935) with Charles Laughton; Anna Karenina (1935) with Greta Garbo; Anthony Adverse (1936) with Olivia de Havilland; and as the original Norman Maine in A Star is Born (1937) with Janet Gaynor, for which he received his third Academy Award nomination.

March resisted signing long-term contracts with the studios, enabling him to play roles in films from a variety of studios. He returned to Broadway after a ten-year absence in 1937 with a notable flop, Yr. Obedient Husband, but after the success of Thornton Wilder's The Skin of Our Teeth, he focused as much on Broadway as on Hollywood. He won two Best Actor Tony Awards: in 1947 for the play Years Ago, written by Ruth Gordon and in 1957 for his performance as James Tyrone in the original Broadway production of Eugene O'Neill's Long Day's Journey Into Night. He also had major successes in A Bell for Adano in 1944 and Gideon in 1961, and he played in Ibsen's An Enemy of the People on Broadway in 1951. During this period, he also starred in films, including I Married a Witch (1942) and Another Part of the Forest (1948). March won his second Oscar in 1946 for The Best Years of Our Lives.

March also branched out into television, winning Emmy nominations for his third attempt at The Royal Family for the series The Best of Broadway as well as for television performances as Samuel Dodsworth and Ebenezer Scrooge. On March 25, 1954, March co-hosted the 26th Annual Academy Awards ceremony from New York City, with co-host Donald O'Connor in Los Angeles.

March's neighbor in Connecticut, playwright Arthur Miller, was thought to favor March to inaugurate the part of Willy Loman in the Pulitzer Prize-winning Death of a Salesman (1949). However, March read the play and turned down the role, whereupon director Elia Kazan cast Lee J. Cobb as Willy and Arthur Kennedy as one of Willy's sons, Biff Loman. Cobb and Kennedy were two actors with whom the director had worked in the film Boomerang (1947). March later regretted turning down the role and finally played Willy Loman in Columbia Pictures's 1951 film version of the play, directed by Laslo Benedek. March earned his fifth and final Oscar nomination as well as a Golden Globe Award. He also played one of two leads in The Desperate Hours (1955) with Humphrey Bogart. Bogart and Spencer Tracy had both insisted upon top billing, and Tracy withdrew, leaving the part available for March.

In 1957, March was awarded the George Eastman Award, given by George Eastman House for "distinguished contribution to the art of film".

On February 12, 1959, March appeared before a joint session of the 86th United States Congress, reading the Gettysburg Address as part of a commemoration of the 150th anniversary of Abraham Lincoln's birth.

March co-starred with Spencer Tracy in the 1960 Stanley Kramer film Inherit the Wind, in which he played a dramatized version of famous orator and political figure William Jennings Bryan. March's Bible-thumping character provided a rival for Tracy's Clarence Darrow-inspired character. In the 1960s, March's film career continued with a performance as President Jordan Lyman in the political thriller Seven Days in May (1964) in which he co-starred with Burt Lancaster, Kirk Douglas, and Edmond O'Brien; the part earned March a Golden Globe nomination as Best Actor.

March made several spoken word recordings, including a version of Oscar Wilde's The Selfish Giant issued in 1945 in which he narrated and played the title role, and The Sounds of History, a twelve volume LP set accompanying the twelve volume set of books The Life History of the United States, published by Time-Life. The recordings were narrated by Charles Collingwood, with March and his wife Florence Eldridge performing dramatic readings from historical documents and literature.

Following surgery for prostate cancer in 1970, it seemed his career was over; yet, he managed to give one last performance in The Iceman Cometh (1973) as the complicated Irish saloon keeper, Harry Hope.

Marriage and public activities

 
March was married to actress Florence Eldridge from 1927 until his death in 1975, and they had two adopted children. They appeared in seven films together, the last being Inherit the Wind.

March and Eldridge commissioned Wallace Neff to build their house in Ridgeview Drive, Bel Air, in 1934. It has subsequently been owned by the philanthropist Wallis Annenberg and the actors Brad Pitt and Jennifer Aniston.

Throughout his life, March and Eldridge were supporters of the Democratic Party. In July 1936, March co-founded the Hollywood Anti-Nazi League (HANL), along with the writers Dorothy Parker and Donald Ogden Stewart, the director Fritz Lang, and the composer Oscar Hammerstein.

In 1938, March was one of many Hollywood personalities who were investigated by the House Un-American Activities Committee (HUAC) and the hunt for Communists in the film community. In July 1940, he was among a number of individuals who were questioned by a HUAC subcommittee which was led by Representative Martin Dies Jr.

Later, in 1948, he and his wife sued the anti-communist publication Counterattack for defamation, seeking $250,000 in damages. The suit was settled out of court.

March died of prostate cancer, at the age of 77, in Los Angeles, and he was buried at his estate in New Milford, Connecticut.

Tributes
March has a star for motion pictures on the Hollywood Walk of Fame, at 1620 Vine Street.

Biographies of March include Fredric March: Craftsman First, Star Second by Deborah C. Peterson (1996), and Fredric March: A Consummate Actor (2013) by Charles Tranberg.

Misunderstanding
March was briefly a member of an interfraternity society composed of leading students formed at the University of Wisconsin–Madison in 1919 and 1920 named the Ku Klux Klan which is not believed to have been affiliated with the notorious organization of that name. In actuality, March was an outspoken proponent of the civil rights movement for five decades, and worked closely with the NAACP.  When the collegiate organization was named, the (later national) KKK was a small regional organization. As the national KKK became better known, the collegiate organization changed its name in 1922.

False rumors based on a misunderstanding of the organization of which March was a member were spread on social media that March was a white supremacist. The 500-seat theater at the University of Wisconsin–Oshkosh was formerly named after March. The University of Wisconsin–Madison had named the 168-seat at the Memorial Union as the Fredric March Play Circle Theater; however, in 2018, his name was removed, after student protests following reports of March's membership in a student fraternal organization calling itself Ku Klux Klan. UW–Oshkosh pulled March's name from what is now the Theatre Arts Center shortly before the 2020–21 academic term. After new revalations about the nature of the KKK fraternity, as of autumn 2022, there were discussions for a return of March's name.

Filmography and awards

Filmography

Awards and nominations

Radio appearances

See also

 List of actors with two or more Academy Awards in acting categories

Footnotes

References
Baxter, John. 1970. Hollywood in the Thirties. International Film Guide Series. Paperback Library, New York. LOC Card Number 68-24003.

External links

 
 
 Photographs of Fredric March

1897 births
1975 deaths
20th-century American male actors
American male film actors
American male stage actors
American male silent film actors
American male television actors
American Presbyterians
Best Actor Academy Award winners
Best Drama Actor Golden Globe (film) winners
California Democrats
David di Donatello winners
Deaths from prostate cancer
Deaths from cancer in California
Male actors from Wisconsin
Military personnel from Wisconsin
Paramount Pictures contract players
People from Racine, Wisconsin
Silver Bear for Best Actor winners
Tony Award winners
United States Army personnel of World War I
United States Army officers
University of Wisconsin–Madison alumni
Volpi Cup for Best Actor winners
Wisconsin Democrats